The Empresa Nacional de Ferrocarriles del Perú (Enafer) is a public company which ensures the management and the commercial use of the railway network of Peru.

Created by decree on September 19, 1972, it was formed by the nationalization of several foreign-owned companies which had serviced mostly two separate networks: the central railroad serving Lima, and the southern railroad offering a second connection to the Pacific Ocean. It has once again been privatised,.

The new Qingzang railway now beats this altitude record.

See also
Ferrocarril Central Andino
Railroad Development Corporation
PeruRail

References

External links
 F.C. CENTRAL ANDINA S.A.,
 FERROCARRIL CENTRAL ANDINO S.A.,
 Map, Callao - Huancayo
 Map, Huancayo - Huancavelica (narrow gauge,  gauge)
 RUTA AREQUIPA - LAGO TITICACA, Cusco - Puno
 RUTA CUSCO - LAGO TITICACA (Standard gauge)
 RUTA CUSCO - MACHU PICCHU (36 in or 914 mm gauge)

Railway companies of Peru
Peruvian brands